Bergen op Zoom (called Berrege  in the local dialect) is a city and municipality in the Southwestern Netherlands. It is located in the province of North Brabant, at the provincial border with Zeeland. In January 2021, the municipality had a population of 67,514.

Etymology 
The city was built on a place where two types of soil meet: sandy soil and marine clay. The sandy soil pushed against the marine clay, accumulating and forming hills over several centuries. People called those hills the Brabantse Wal, literally meaning "ramparts of Brabant". Zoom refers to the border of these ramparts and bergen in Dutch means mountains or hills. The name has nothing to do with the little channel, the Zoom, which was later built through Bergen op Zoom.

History 

Bergen op Zoom was granted city status probably in 1212. In 1287 the city and its surroundings became a lordship as it was separated from the lordship of Breda. The lordship was elevated to a margraviate in 1559. Several noble families, including the House of Glymes, ruled Bergen op Zoom in succession until 1795, although the title was only nominal since at least the seventeenth century.

During the early modern period, Bergen op Zoom was a very strong fortress and one of the main armories and arsenals of the United Provinces. It had a remarkable natural defensive site, surrounded as it was by marshes and easily flooded polders. Furthermore, it could receive reinforcements and supplies by sea, if the besieging army did not have a fleet to blockade its port.

Due to these features, the city was one of the strategic points held by the Dutch during their revolt in the Eighty Years War, beginning in the late sixteenth century. It was at that time besieged by Alessandro Farnese first in 1588, and by Ambrosio Spinola a second time in 1622. Both sieges were unsuccessful, and Bergen op Zoom got the nickname La Pucelle or The Virgin as it was never successfully taken in a siege.

In 1747, during the War of the Austrian Succession, the French army laid siege to the city. Bergen op Zoom had been fortified by new works built at the beginning of the 17th century by Menno van Coehoorn, with three forts surrounding the city and a canalized diversion of the Scheldt acting as a ditch around its walls. However, it had no second line of fortifications, nor any fortress. After seventy days of siege, the city was taken and thoroughly sacked; the garrison was slaughtered.

During the War of the Sixth Coalition, the town was again besieged by the British in March 1814 in a failed attempt to dislodge the French garrison.

Trading town
During the reign of Jan II van Glymes (1417–1494), nicknamed "Jan metten Lippen" (meaning "Jan with the big lips", probably caused by an infection), a surge in economic growth occurred in the city. Large fairs were held twice a year, in spring and fall, that were known both nationally and internationally. Merchants from all over Europe came to Bergen op Zoom to sell their goods.

Because of this major economic growth, the Sint-Gertrudischurch was enlarged. The enlargement was called the Nieuw Werck but was never finished, because of the economic recession of the mid-16th century. It fell into ruin. The economic recession was largely caused by the poor accessibility of the port, due to a number of floods in Zeeland and West-Brabant.  Because of the great reliance on the port, the economic growth received a major blow. In addition, the modernization of trade techniques, such as establishing of a permanent stock exchange instead of the fairs, which took place twice a year, also damaged the local economy.

The fairs continued until 1910. Despite the end of the two big fairs, Bergen op Zoom still hosts all kinds of smaller fairs and events.

Religion
During the Eighty Years' War, Bergen op Zoom chose the side of the Dutch Republic, and, simultaneously, for Protestantism. The Catholics of the city either adapted or moved to the surrounding countryside, which remained largely Catholic. The inhabitants who chose to stay Catholic went to church in secret barns and houses, since the local Sint-Getrudischurch was assigned to the Protestant community.

Slowly, most of the city council members of Bergen op Zoom became Protestant. Protestants dominated the council until the 18th century. After that, the number of Catholics in Bergen op Zoom increased and, during the second part of the 18th century, a majority of Bergen op Zoom's population was Catholic again. Although the Catholics enjoyed religious freedom during the French period in 1795–1814, their emancipation did not take place until later.

In 1832, a Catholic parish, the ‘Heilige Maagd ten Ophemeling’, was allowed to have its own church. In the same period, the Jewish community built a synagogue for their use. 

In 1972, the Protestant community, after the loss of many members, gave the Sint-Getrudischurch to the Catholic parish. Since the return of the Church, Catholic services have been held here again.

Population centres
Bergen op Zoom (population: 65,691, July 2006)
Heimolen
Halsteren (11,410)
Lepelstraat (2,070)
Kladde

City of Bergen op Zoom

The Markiezenhof Palace, built in the fifteenth and sixteenth centuries, houses a cultural centre and a museum with a picturesque courtyard, paintings, period rooms, and temporary exhibitions.
SABIC Innovative Plastics operates a major manufacturing facility in Bergen op Zoom. Philip Morris was another major employer until it closed its plant in 2014.

Transport
Bergen op Zoom railway station

Notable people

The arts 
 Jacob Obrecht (1457–1505)  composer, mainly of sacred music
 Desiderius Erasmus (1466–1536) humanist, philosopher, author
 Abel Grimmer (1570–1619) a Flemish late Renaissance painter, mainly of landscapes 
 Gerrit Houckgeest (1600–1661) a Dutch Golden Age painter of architectural scenes and church interiors
 Bartram de Fouchier (1609–1673) a Dutch Golden Age painter
 Marcus Zuerius van Boxhorn (1612–1653) historian, author and scholar
 Thomas Willeboirts Bosschaert (1613–1654) a Flemish Baroque painter 
 Pieter van der Willigen (1634–1694) a Flemish Baroque painter
 Govert-Marinus Augustijn (1871–1963) a Dutch Art Nouveau potter
 Kees Smout (1876–1961) a Dutch sculptor
 Anton van Duinkerken (1903–1968) a Dutch poet, essayist and academic
 Louis Boekhout (1919–2012) a Dutch painter who emigrated to Québec, Canada
 Pleuni Touw (born 1938) a Dutch film, television and theatre actress
 Adriaan Ditvoorst (1940–1987) a Dutch film director, screenwriter
 Cornald Maas (born 1967) a Dutch television presenter 
 Martin Fondse (born 1967) a Dutch pianist and composer who plays the vibrandoneon
 Bob van Luijt (born 1985) a Dutch technology entrepreneur, technologist and new media artist

Public thinking and public service 
 Pieter Gerardus van Overstraten (1755–1801) last Governor-General of the Dutch East Indies
 Gerrit Verdooren van Asperen (1757–1824) vice-admiral of the Royal Netherlands Navy
 Gillis Pieter de Neve (1823-1883) commander of the Royal Netherlands East Indies Army 
 Albert Vogel (1874–1933) a Dutch Army officer and teacher
 Peter Sitsen (1885–1945) a military officer, building contractor and public servant in colonial Indonesia
 Ed Nijpels (born 1950) a retired Dutch politician
 Virginie Korte-van Hemel (1929–2014) a Dutch politician
 Bernard de Wit (born 1945) a Dutch theoretical physicist and academic
 Paul Schnabel (born 1948) a Dutch sociologist, academic and politician
 Wim Crusio (born 1954) a Dutch behavioral neurogeneticist and academic
 Fatma Koşer Kaya (born 1968) a Dutch lawyer and politician of Turkish origin

Sports 

 Reindert de Favauge (1872–1949) sport shooter, competed at the 1908 & 1920 Summer Olympics 
 Henk Kersken (1880–1967) a sailor who competed at the 1928 Summer Olympics
 Barent Momma (1897–1936) a Dutch modern pentathlete, competed at the 1924 Summer Olympics
 Willem van Rhijn (1903–1979) a Dutch modern pentathlete, competed at the 1928 and 1932 Summer Olympics
 Janus van der Zande (1924–2016) a Dutch marathon runner, competed in the 1952 Summer Olympics 
 Maarten Sikking (1948–2009) a field hockey goalkeeper, competed at the 1972 and 1976 Summer Olympics
 Rico Verhoeven (born 1989) a Dutch kickboxer
 Jacob Van Braam (1729-1792) a soldier of fortune, swordmaster and mercenary

Music
 Julia Boschman (born 2002) a Dutch singer in famous girl group K3

International relations

Twin towns — sister cities
Bergen op Zoom is twinned with:

See also
 12709 Bergen op Zoom
 Fort de Roovere
 Black Death
 Crusio (ice cream parlor)
 Merck toch hoe sterck

Notes

References

Further reading

 A Ballad on the Taking of Bergen-Op Zoom. London: M. Cooper, 1747.
 Merck toch hoe sterck. The anthem of the city: A. Valerius, 1626.
 Bot, Marie-Louise, and Gouke J. Bonsel. The Bergen Op Zoom-Quality of Life Survey: A Dutch Contribution to the Collaborative Study of the European Common Core Group. Rotterdam: Dept. of Public Health and Social Medicine/Institute for Medical Technology Assessment, Erasmus University Rotterdam, 1989. 
 Edler, Florence. Attendance at the Fairs of Bergen-Op-Zoom 1538–1544. Bergen op Zoom: [s.n.], 1936.
 Smyth, James Carmichael. Plans of the Attacks Upon Antwerp, Bergen-Op-Zoom, Cambray, Peronne, Maubeuge, Landrecy, Marienbourg, Philippeville and Rocroy, By the British and Prussian Armies in the Campaigns of 1814 and of 1815. 1817.
 1939–1945 The War Dead of the Commonwealth: The Register of the Names of Those Who Fell and Are Buried in Cemeteries in the Netherlands: Bergen Op Zoom Canadian War Cemetery. Maidenhead: Commonwealth War Graves Commission, 1994.

External links

Official website

 
Cities in the Netherlands
Municipalities of North Brabant
Populated places in North Brabant